State Road 468 (NM 468) is a  state highway in the US state of New Mexico. NM 468's western terminus is at the end of state maintenance by the entrance to New Mexico Boys School northwest of Springer, and the eastern terminus is at Interstate 25 Business (I-25 Bus.) in Springer.

Major intersections

See also

References

468
Transportation in Colfax County, New Mexico